Knoll Hospital is a health facility at Station Road in Duns, Scotland. It is managed by NHS Borders. It is a Category B listed building.

History
The hospital was established with the conversion of a late 19th century mansion to create a maternity hospital in 1938. It joined the National Health Service as Knoll Maternity Hospital in 1948. After a local medical practice withdrew support, the capacity of the hospital was reduced from 23 beds to 18 beds in August 2013.

References

Hospitals in the Scottish Borders
1838 establishments in Scotland
Hospitals established in 1838
NHS Scotland hospitals
NHS Borders
Duns, Scottish Borders